Zlatoutovsk is a rural locality (a settlement) and the administrative center of Zlatoutovsky Selsoviet of Selemdzhinsky District, Amur Oblast, Russia. The population was 651 as of 2018. There are 17 streets.

Geography 
Zlatoutovsk is located 80 km southeast of Ekimchan (the district's administrative centre) by road. Albyn is the nearest rural locality.

References 

Rural localities in Selemdzhinsky District